The Golden Horse Award for Best Animated Feature is an award presented annually at the Golden Horse Awards by the Taipei Golden Horse Film Festival Executive Committee, though for some editions, both nominees and winner were absent. Yee Chih-yen is the latest winner, winning for City of Lost Things at the 57th Golden Horse Awards in 2020.

References

Golden Horse Film Awards